Know Your Enemy is a political podcast about the American conservative movement from a socialist perspective. It is hosted by Matthew Sitman, a former conservative, and Sam Adler-Bell, a lifetime leftist. The podcast is sponsored by the American Left magazine Dissent. The podcast covers the movement's intellectual foundations and has a bipartisan listenership. The podcast was founded in 2019.

References

Further reading 

 

2019 podcast debuts
American podcasts
History podcasts
Socialist podcasts
Patreon creators